Seven Little Australians was a 10-part TV series that aired on ABC Television in 1973. Captain Woolcot is a widower with seven children. He marries again and his new wife takes on all the trials of bringing up seven spirited children. The mini-series was based on Ethel Turner's best-selling novel, Seven Little Australians.  Music for the television miniseries was composed by Bruce Smeaton.

It won the Gold Logie in 1974 for Best New Drama. 

The series was largely faithful to the book; differences include the fact that Judy was thin and waiflike in the book, she is more solidly built in the series. Meg's hair was long and dark, but in the book her hair is long and blonde.

The series has been released on a 2-disc region 4 DVD set in Australia.

Cast

References

Australian television series
1970s Australian drama television series
Television shows based on Australian novels
Australian Broadcasting Corporation original programming
1973 Australian television series debuts
1973 Australian television series endings
Television shows set in colonial Australia